Alison Sheppard,  (born 5 November 1972) is a freestyle swimmer from Scotland.

Swimming career
She competed in five consecutive Summer Olympics for Great Britain, starting in 1988.

She is a seven times winner of the British Championship in 50 metres freestyle (1991 and 1999–2004) and the 2003 100 metres freestyle.

Sheppard was appointed Member of the Order of the British Empire (MBE) in the 2003 Birthday Honours for services to swimming.

Personal bests and records held

See also
 List of World Aquatics Championships medalists in swimming (women)
 List of Commonwealth Games medallists in swimming (women)

References

External links
British Swimming athlete profile

1972 births
Living people
Scottish female swimmers
Scottish female freestyle swimmers
Sportspeople from Glasgow
People educated at the High School of Glasgow
Swimmers at the 1990 Commonwealth Games
Swimmers at the 1994 Commonwealth Games
Swimmers at the 1998 Commonwealth Games
Swimmers at the 2002 Commonwealth Games
Commonwealth Games gold medallists for Scotland
Commonwealth Games silver medallists for Scotland
Commonwealth Games bronze medallists for Scotland
Swimmers at the 1988 Summer Olympics
Swimmers at the 1992 Summer Olympics
Swimmers at the 1996 Summer Olympics
Swimmers at the 2000 Summer Olympics
Swimmers at the 2004 Summer Olympics
Olympic swimmers of Great Britain
World Aquatics Championships medalists in swimming
Medalists at the FINA World Swimming Championships (25 m)
European Aquatics Championships medalists in swimming
Members of the Order of the British Empire
Commonwealth Games medallists in swimming
Medallists at the 1998 Commonwealth Games
Medallists at the 2002 Commonwealth Games